Aedan: Garden of Desire is a 2017 Indian Malayalam film directed by Sanju Surendran. The film stars Abhilash Nair, George Kurian, Prasant, Nandini Sree, Sunny, Jojo George, and Dileep Kumar. Aedan is more of a folktale in its elemental qualities and evocation of eternal human passions. Following the tradition of Indian epic narration, the structure of the film is that of a story within a story. The stories attempt a microscopic examination of human nature. As the story courses through the frustrations of the characters, the idyllic landscape of a beautiful Kerala village takes on diabolic dimensions during night time.

The film premiered at the 2017 International Film Festival of Kerala.

Synopsis
The thread of the story is from the three short stories of S Hareesh - 'Niryatharayi', 'Manthrikavaalu', and 'Chappathile Kolapathakam'.
 Hari, a submissive man after meeting Peter (a retired school principal) becomes a man with wild intentions.
 Neetu a strong female figure strongly explores her sexuality with lecherous Bineesh while transporting her father's dead body, and they both are happy with it.
 Thampi, a rowdy from mistaking John Abraham (director) for Jesus Christ becomes reformed, and hearing their feared rowdy's story under intoxication, two friends feels silly and blabber mischievous stuff about each other, and one kills the other.

Cast
Abhilash Nair as Immanuel as Hari
Nandini Sree as Jeevan Raj as Neetu
Prasant M. Madathilkarottu as Bineesh (as Prasant)
Spadikam Sunny alias Torappan Bastian as Maadan Tampi
George Kurian as Peter Sir
Jojo George as Kaliyar Kuruvila
Rahul Pratap as Hospital Attendant
P.M. Yesudas as Neelakandan (as Yesudas)

Awards 
The film has received the following honors:
 International Film Festival of Kerala
 2017: FIPRESCI award for the best Malayalam film at the 22nd International Film Festival of Kerala, India
 2017: Rajathachakoram award for the best debut director at the 22nd International Film Festival of Kerala, India
 Kerala State Film Awards
 2017: Second Best Film
 2017: Best adapted screenplay
 2017: Best Cinematography
 2017: Best Sound Editing

References

External links
 

2017 films
Indian drama films
Films based on short fiction
2010s Malayalam-language films